Menophra is a genus of moths in the family Geometridae erected by Frederic Moore in 1887.

The name Menophra is composed of the Greek mene (moon) and ophrus (brow) and refers to the moon shapes that are formed by the strong tooth-like shapes in the rim of the hindwing.

Species
 Menophra aborta (Warren, 1898)
 Menophra abruptaria (Thunberg, 1792)
 Menophra anaplagiata Sato, 1984
 Menophra contenta (Prout, 1915)
 Menophra dnophera (Prout, 1915)
 Menophra grummi (Alphéraky, 1888)
 Menophra harterti (Rothschild, 1912)
 Menophra humeraria (Moore, 1868)
 Menophra japygiaria (O. Costa, 1849)
 Menophra lignata (Warren, 1894)
 Menophra mitsundoi Sato, 1984
 Menophra nakajimai Sato, 1984
 Menophra nycthemeraria (Geyer, 1831)
 Menophra praestantaria (Püngeler, 1902)
 Menophra retractaria (Moore, 1868)
 Menophra senilis (Butler, 1878)
 Menophra taiwana (Wileman, 1910)
 Menophra trypanaria (Wiltshire, 1948)

References

Boarmiini